Microsoft Office Live Communications Server 2003 provides real-time communications platform allowing for voice, video, and instant messaging.

Microsoft Office Live Communications Server 2003 (LCS), provided many capabilities that were notably absent from the company's earlier Exchange IM solution, including encryption, logging, and standards-based protocols. While LCS delivers a compelling glimpse of the future of corporate IM, we expect it will truly come into its own only after companies roll out Windows Server 2003 and the Office 2003 suite.

Other versions
Live Communications Server 2005
Live Communications Server 2005 with SP1

References
Microsoft Office Live Communications Server 2003 Overview

Instant messaging server software